Michaël D'Almeida (born 3 September 1987) is a French track cyclist. He specialises in track sprint events including the sprint, team sprint, keirin and 1 kilometer. He has ridden for the Union sportive de Créteil cycling club since 2006. D'Almeida is married and has children, he is involved with the French armed forces.

Major results

2005
1st  team sprint, 2007 European Track Championships – Junior
2nd team sprint, UCI Track Cycling World Championships – Junior
3rd team sprint, French National Track Championships – Senior
3rd sprint, French National Track Championships – Junior
3rd kilo, French National Track Championships – Junior

2006
1st  team sprint, French National Track Championships – Senior
3rd kilo, French National Track Championships – Senior
3rd sprint, French National Track Championships – U23

2007
1st  team sprint, 2007 European Track Championships – U23
2nd kilo, 2007 European Track Championships – U23
1st kilo, round 1, 2007–2008 UCI Track Cycling World Cup Classics, Sydney

2008
1st  kilo, 2008 European Track Championships – U23
1st sprint, 2008 European Track Championships – U23
1st keirin, 2008 European Track Championships – U23
1st  kilo, French National Track Championships – Senior
2nd kilo, 2008 UCI Track Cycling World Championships
1st kilo, round 2, 2008–2009 UCI Track Cycling World Cup Classics, Melbourne
2nd sprint, round 2, 2008–2009 UCI Track Cycling World Cup Classics, Melbourne

2009
1st  kilo, European Track Championships – U23
1st  team sprint, European Track Championships – U23
2nd team sprint, round 4, 2008–2009 UCI Track Cycling World Cup Classics, Beijing
2nd kilo, round 5, 2008–2009 UCI Track Cycling World Cup Classics, Copenhagen
3rd team sprint, round 5, 2008–2009 UCI Track Cycling World Cup Classics, Copenhagen
1st kilo, round 3, 2008–2009 UCI Track Cycling World Cup Classics, Cali
1st keirin, round 3, 2008–2009 UCI Track Cycling World Cup Classics, Cali
2013
2nd  team sprint, European Track Championships
2014
1st Keirin, Fenioux Piste International
1st Team sprint, Fenioux Piste International
2nd Sprint, Fenioux Piste International

References

External links

1987 births
Living people
People from Évry, Essonne
French male cyclists
French people of Portuguese descent
French track cyclists
Cyclists at the 2012 Summer Olympics
Cyclists at the 2016 Summer Olympics
Olympic cyclists of France
Olympic silver medalists for France
Olympic bronze medalists for France
Olympic medalists in cycling
Medalists at the 2012 Summer Olympics
Medalists at the 2016 Summer Olympics
Knights of the Ordre national du Mérite
Sportspeople from Essonne
Cyclists from Île-de-France